Tajen University is a private university in Yanpu Township, Pingtung County, Taiwan.

History
Taoyi Huang, the incumbent chairman of the board, and Yuan Tsai Lee, founded Tajen Pharmacy Institute in 1966. Tajen has grown and prospered during the years. When the institute was established, there was only one Department of Pharmacy, a five-year program for junior college students.

In 1980 other departments were established. Since its foundation, Tajen has been implementing its motto and pursuing the goal of becoming an excellent institute of higher learning. It has achieved this and has gained recognition from the Ministry of Education and society-at-large.

Tajen was upgraded from a five-year junior college to a university-level institute of Tajen University with affiliate five-year junior college programs since August 1, 1999 by permission of the Ministry of Education. Moreover, to carry out the education policy of lifelong learning, Tajen provides programs such as a two-year bachelor program for junior college graduates, and another two-year program for high school graduates. Currently, the student population exceeds 14,000.

The present president is Dr. Rhei-Long Chen.

Faculties
 College of Humanities and Informatics
 College of Leisure and Hospitality
 College of Pharmacy and Health Care

See also
 List of universities in Taiwan

1966 establishments in Taiwan
Educational institutions established in 1966
Private universities and colleges in Taiwan
Universities and colleges in Pingtung County
Universities and colleges in Taiwan
Technical universities and colleges in Taiwan